The 2014 United States House of Representatives election in South Dakota was held on Tuesday, November 4, 2014 to elect the U.S. representative from South Dakota's at-large congressional district, who would represent the state of South Dakota in the 114th United States Congress. The election coincided with the elections of a U.S. Senator from South Dakota, the Governor of South Dakota and other federal and state offices. Incumbent Republican U.S. Representative Kristi Noem won reelection.

Republican nomination

Candidates

Declared
 Kristi Noem, incumbent U.S. Representative

Democratic nomination

Candidates

Declared
 Corinna Robinson, retired Army officer and Iraq War veteran

Declined
 Steve Jarding, educator, lecturer and political consultant

Independents and third parties

Candidates

Failed to make the ballot
 Charles "Chuck" Haan (Constitution), Independent candidate for the State House in 2000

Withdrew
 Lori Stacey (Constitution), nominee for Secretary of State of South Dakota in 2010 (ran for Secretary of State)

General election

Polling

Results

See also
 United States Senate election in South Dakota, 2014
 2014 South Dakota gubernatorial election
 2014 United States Senate elections
 2014 United States elections

References

External links
 U.S. House elections in South Dakota, 2014 at Ballotpedia
 Campaign contributions at OpenSecrets
 Kristi Noem for Congress
 Corinna Robinson for Congress

South Dakota
2014
United States House of Representatives